Tannabar, New South Wales is  a bounded rural locality in New South Wales. The suburb is just outside to the town of Coonabarabran in Gowan County, New South Wales.

References

History of New South Wales
Geography of New South Wales
Localities in New South Wales